The 2002–03 Colorado Buffaloes Men's basketball team represented the University of Colorado as a member of the Big 12 Conference during the 2002–03 season. Led by 7th-year head coach Ricardo Patton, the Buffaloes played their home games at the Coors Events Center in Boulder, Colorado. After finishing 4th in the conference regular season standings, Colorado reached the semifinal round of the Big 12 tournament. The team did receive an at-large bid to the NCAA tournament as No. 10 seed in the South region  the program's first NCAA tournament selection in six seasons. Colorado would lose to Michigan State in the opening round to finish the season with a 20–12 record (9–7 Big 12).

Roster

Schedule and results

|-
!colspan=9 style=| Non-conference regular season

|-
!colspan=9 style=| Big 12 Regular Season

|-
!colspan=9 style=| Big 12 Tournament

|-
!colspan=9 style=| NCAA Tournament

Rankings

References

Colorado Buffaloes men's basketball seasons
Colorado
Colorado